Edwin Castagna  (May 1, 1909 – November 26, 1983) was a prominent librarian and leader in the profession. Castagna was born in Petaluma, California, to Frank and Eugenia Burgle Castagna. He graduated from the library school at the University of California, Berkeley in 1936 and started his career as an assistant librarian in the Alameda County Public Library in Oakland, California. He left that position within a year to become the library director for the Ukiah, California Public Library. In 1940 he became Director of the Washoe County Public Library in Reno, Nevada where he became the first president of the Nevada Library Association. Castagna took a leave of absence to join the U.S. Army to serve in World War II.  After the war, Castagna returned to Washoe County to continue his work as their library director. In 1949 Castagna became the director the Glendale, California Public Library but was only in Glendale for a year when he was offered the director's position at the Long Beach Public Library. While in Long Beach, Castagna served as president of the California Library Association in 1954.

In 1960, Castagna was offered the position of director of the Enoch Pratt Free Library in Baltimore, Maryland. During his tenure, the Pratt Library took responsibility for the Peabody Institute Library and helped to establish a library school at the University of Maryland. During his time in Baltimore, Castagna served as president of the American Library Association from 1964 to 1965. He retired from the Pratt Library in 1975.

On November 26, 1983 Castagna and his wife Rachel Dent Castagna took their own lives by taking sleeping pills after Edwin Castagna received a terminal health diagnosis. Their estates were split between bequests to the Enoch Pratt Free Library and the library school at the University of California, Berkeley.

Publications
 Caught in the act : the decisive reading of some notable men and women and its influence on their actions and attitudes (Scarecrow Press, 1982)  
 Censorship, intellectual freedom, and libraries (Seminar Press, 1971)
 Long, warm friendship: H.L. Mencken and the Enoch Pratt Free Library (Peacock Press, 1966)
 National inventory of library needs (American Library Association, 1965)
 The history of the 771st Tank Battalion (Lederer, Street & Zeus, 1946)

References

 

1909 births
1983 deaths
Presidents of the American Library Association
American librarians
University of California, Berkeley School of Information alumni
People from Petaluma, California
1983 suicides
Drug-related suicides in Maryland
Joint suicides
United States Army personnel of World War II